Gaurav Sharma (born 10 April 1992) is an Indian singer and composer. He started his career as a RJ in All India Radio and later in 2017 his first album launched with Zee Music Company. Apart from his original compositions, he is recreating some old songs like Rimjhim Gire Sawaan, Gulabi Aakhein, Anamika, etc.

Career 
He started learning music since class 4. He started his career as a radio jockey in All India Radio where he was doing a radio show named Ek Khaas Mulaqaat Sitaron ke saath and interviewed some celebraties like Salman Khan, Hema Malini, Prem Chopra, Sharman Joshi, Udit Narayan, Suresh Wadkar, Abhijeet Bhattacharya, Kailash Kher, Shaan, Nawazuddin Siddiqui, Amrita Rao, etc.

In 2017 his first album Tu Pyar Hai Mera has been launched with Zee Music Company starring Bollywood actress Tara Alisha Berry. His another album with Zee Music has released in 2019 starring TV actress Mansi Srivastava. He has been training Tihar jail prisoners from several years.

References

External links
 
 Gaurav Sharma on Gaana

1992 births
Living people
Hindi-language singers
Indian male playback singers